Aarno Fredrik Pesonen (14 October 1886, Kauhava – 12 February 1927) was a Finnish educationist and politician. He served as a Member of the Parliament of Finland from 1919 to 1924, representing the Agrarian League.

References

1886 births
1927 deaths
People from Kauhava
People from Vaasa Province (Grand Duchy of Finland)
Centre Party (Finland) politicians
Members of the Parliament of Finland (1919–22)
Members of the Parliament of Finland (1922–24)
University of Helsinki alumni